The 1997 Vuelta a Asturias was the 41st edition of the Vuelta a Asturias road cycling stage race, which was held from 13 May to 18 May 1997. The race started in Avilés and finished in Oviedo. The race was won by Manuel Fernández Ginés of the  team.

General classification

References

Vuelta Asturias
1997 in road cycling
1997 in Spanish sport